Scaphella junonia, common name the dubious volute, is a species of sea snail, a marine gastropod mollusk in the family Volutidae, the volutes.

References

Volutidae
Gastropods described in 1827
Taxa named by William Broderip